Running Battle is a 1992 Sega Master System beat 'em up video game that was released exclusively in Europe.

Gameplay
This game is a brawler where the police officer has to eliminate a series of armed thugs that are trying to take over his city. The enemy leader's name is simply the letter "M" and he calls his troops "The Soldiers of Darkness". Players can only move from left to right, like in a side-scrolling platformer. The player can also regain health from certain power-ups, in addition to getting a temporary boost in muscle power and the temporary ability to access weapons.

There are five levels in the game, which are divided into sub-levels and end with a confrontation with a powerful boss. Each section can be crossed over without killing anyone. However, the player is required to destroy a minimum amount of enemies on the screen.

Reception

The game was negatively reviewed by Mean Machines magazine for its low quality graphics, sound and gameplay.

References

External links

1992 video games
Sega beat 'em ups
Europe-exclusive video games
Master System games
Master System-only games
Video games about police officers
Video games developed in Japan